Jeszenszky or Jesenský  (also Jessensky, Jessinsky, Jessensky de Gross Jessen) is the name of two old noble families in the Kingdom of Hungary. They have a mutual name but their origins are different.

Kisjeszen family

The first known ancestor of the Kisjeszen (Minor Jeszen) family was the castle warrior András Temérdek who received lands in Turóc County from king Béla IV of Hungary in 1255. The family introduced their new surname after the name of a village "Jeszen" (Jaseno, now Turčianske Jaseno).  In the 14th century the family used the "Kisjeszeni" ("de Kisjeszen") name form and the Slovak variant of their name "Jeszenszky" came into use from the 15th century.

Nagyjeszen family
The first known member of the Nagyjeszen (Major Jeszen) family was called Mágya. In 1278 Mágya received his noble title, because of his valor in the Battle on the Marchfeld.

Famous members of the families
Ladislaus Jesenský died in 1526 during the catastrophic Battle of Mohács. Subsequently, all Jesenský property was confiscated by the advancing Ottomans, so brothers Melchior, Lorenz and Balthasar Jesenský moved to Silesia (then part of the Crown of Bohemia) and lived in Wrocław and Świdnica from 1541 onward. Balthasar's son was Ján Jesenský, known as Jan Jesenius, famous scientist and politician who lived and died in Prague, Bohemia.

Branches of the families are still living in Slovakia, the Czech Republic, Hungary, United States and England. 

Important family members:
 Jan Jesenius (1566–1621), Bohemian physician, philosopher and politician, rector of Charles University in Prague
 Růžena Jesenská (1863–1940), Czech novelist
 Jan Jesenský (1870–1947), Czech scientist, professor of Charles University
 Janko Jesenský (1874–1945), Slovak poet, prose writer and translator
 Milena Jesenská (1896–1944), Czech journalist and translator, friend of Franz Kafka
 Jan Jesenský Jr. (1904–1942), Czech scientist, assistant professor of Charles University
 Ferenc Jeszenszky (1905–1990), Hungarian economist, during 1949–52 was a president of Hungarian National Bank in Budapest
 Géza Jeszenszky (1941–), Hungarian politician, in 1990–94 foreign minister of Hungary

See also
Jeszenszky (surname)
List of titled noble families in the Kingdom of Hungary

References

Sources 
 Jan Jesenius and his family's short bio (Hungarian)

 
Jesensky
Jeszenszky
Jeszenszky
Jesensky
Jesensky
Jeszenszky